Robert Moncur (born 19 January 1945) is a Scottish former professional footballer. Moncur is most famous for his role as captain of Newcastle United in the late 1960s and of the Scottish national side in the early 1970s. Moncur was part of the Newcastle team that won the Inter-Cities Fairs Cup in 1969, scoring three goals across the two legs of the final.

Post-football
Nowadays, Moncur makes semi-frequent appearances on Sky TV as a football pundit. Moncur currently holds the record of being the last Newcastle United captain to lift silverware for the club and is frequently quoted as wanting to lose this honour as quickly as possible.

Personal life
In September 2007, Moncur was diagnosed with cancer of the colon and nine months later was informed that he was now in remission. Moncur was awarded the freedom of Gateshead in November 2008. He was diagnosed with oesophageal cancer in January 2014.

See also
List of Scotland national football team captains

References

External links

1945 births
Living people
Footballers from Perth, Scotland
Scottish footballers
Association football defenders
Newcastle United F.C. players
Sunderland A.F.C. players
Carlisle United F.C. players
English Football League players
Scotland international footballers
Scottish football managers
Carlisle United F.C. managers
Heart of Midlothian F.C. managers
Plymouth Argyle F.C. managers
Hartlepool United F.C. managers
English Football League managers
Scotland under-23 international footballers
Scottish Football League managers
Newcastle United F.C. directors and chairmen
FA Cup Final players